Peter Rebien (born 25 September 1935) is a German sailor. He competed in the Dragon event at the 1960 Summer Olympics.

References

External links
 

1935 births
Living people
German male sailors (sport)
Olympic sailors of the United Team of Germany
Sailors at the 1960 Summer Olympics – Dragon
Sportspeople from Lübeck